Vågosen or Vågos is a village in the municipality of Aure in Møre og Romsdal county, Norway.

Geography
Vågosen lies on the south side of the island of Ertvågsøy along Arasvik Fjord at the mouth of the Vågos River (Vågoselva). There are road connections to Vågosen via County Road 682 from the north and County Road 362 from the east. The ferry west of the village connects Vågosen to Hennset in the municipality of Halsa and European route E39.

References

External links
Vågosen at Norgeskart

Aure, Norway
Villages in Møre og Romsdal